Encruzilhada do Sul is a municipality in the state of Rio Grande do Sul, Brazil.

Climate 
The climate is humid subtropical (Köppen: Cfa), with hot summers and mild winters, with rare occasions at 0 °C or below, typical of areas at low altitudes in the subtropics. It is similar with other cities of Rio Grande do Sul and Santa Catarina on the plains or with cities in eastern Australia. The climate is sunny and humid all year round.

See also
Paleorrota Geopark
List of municipalities in Rio Grande do Sul

References

Municipalities in Rio Grande do Sul